Let Him Have It is a 1991 British drama film directed by Peter Medak and starring Christopher Eccleston, Paul Reynolds, Tom Courtenay and Tom Bell. The film is based on the true story of Derek Bentley, who was convicted of the murder of a police officer by joint enterprise and was hanged in 1953 under controversial circumstances.

Plot summary
Derek Bentley is an illiterate, epileptic young adult with developmental disabilities who falls into a gang led by a younger teenager named Christopher Craig. During the course of the robbery of a warehouse in Croydon, in which Bentley is encouraged to participate by Craig, the two become trapped by the police. Officers order Craig to put down his gun. Bentley, who by this time has already been arrested, shouts "Let him have it, Chris" – whether he means the phrase literally ("Let him have the gun") or figuratively ("Open fire!") is unclear. Craig fires, killing one officer and wounding another. Because he is a minor, Craig is given a prison sentence for the crime. Meanwhile, Bentley is sentenced to death under the English common law principle of joint enterprise, on the basis that his statement to Craig was an instigation to shoot. Bentley's family makes an effort for clemency which reaches Parliament. However, the Home Secretary (who has the power to commute the death sentence) ultimately declines to intervene. Despite his family's efforts and public support, Bentley is executed in 1953 within a month of being convicted, before Parliament takes any official action.

Cast

 Christopher Eccleston as Derek Bentley
 Paul Reynolds as Christopher Craig
 Tom Courtenay as William Bentley
 Eileen Atkins as Lilian Bentley
 Clare Holman as Iris Bentley
 Tom Bell as Detective Sergeant Fairfax
 Edward Hardwicke as Approved School Principal  
 Serena Scott Thomas as Stella
 Mark McGann as Niven Craig
 Murray Melvin as Secondary School Teacher 
 Michael Gough as Lord Goddard
 Iain Cuthbertson as Sir David Maxwell-Fyfe
 Peter Eyre as Humphreys
 James Villiers as Cassels
 Clive Revill as Albert Pierrepoint (hangman)
 Vernon Dobtcheff as Court Clerk
 Bill Dean as Foreman of the Jury
 Norman Rossington as Postman
 Michael Elphick as Prison Officer Jack

Production
Paul Bergman and Michael Asimow call attention to the cross examination scene, where "the camera closes in on [Bentley's] bruised face as the prosecutor and judge bombard him with questions he can barely comprehend."
 
The film's end titles state that Bentley's sister, Iris, was still fighting for his pardon. Seven years after the film was made and after numerous unsuccessful campaigns to get Derek Bentley a full pardon, his conviction was eventually overturned by the Court of Appeal on 30 July 1998, one year after Iris's death.

Reception
The film gained positive reviews from critics. It holds an 84% approval rating from the review aggregation site Rotten Tomatoes based on 37 reviews, with an average rating of 7.7/10. The website's critical consensus reads, "Led by a gripping performance from Christopher Eccleston, Let Him Have It sounds a compelling call for justice on behalf of its real-life protagonist."

Tom Wiener said that the film displayed the writers Neal Purvis and Robert Wade's "outrage toward a system hell-bent on vengeance" and John Ivan Simon called the script "first rate, no nonsense".

References

External links
 
 
 Let Him Have It film review, Channel 4

1990s biographical drama films
1990s English-language films
1990s legal drama films
1990s legal films
1991 crime drama films
1991 films
British biographical drama films
British courtroom films
British crime drama films
British legal films
Crime films based on actual events
Drama films based on actual events
Films about capital punishment
Films about miscarriage of justice
Films about murder
Films directed by Peter Medak
Films scored by Michael Kamen
Films set in 1941
Films set in 1948
Films set in 1951
Films set in 1952
Films set in 1953
Films set in London
Films set in Surrey
Films shot at Pinewood Studios
Films with screenplays by Neal Purvis and Robert Wade
1990s British films